Björn Borg defeated Manuel Orantes in the final, 2–6, 6–7(4–7), 6–0, 6–1, 6–1 to win the men's singles tennis title at the 1974 French Open. It was the first of his eventual six French Open titles (an all-time record until it was surpassed by Rafael Nadal at the 2012 French Open).

Ilie Năstase was the defending champion, but lost in the quarterfinals to Harold Solomon.

The first two rounds of the tournament were played as best-of-three sets, while the last five rounds were played as best-of-five sets.

Seeds
The seeded players are listed below. Björn Borg is the champion; others show the round in which they were eliminated.

  Ilie Năstase (quarterfinals)
  Jan Kodeš (fourth round)
  Björn Borg (champion)
  Arthur Ashe (fourth round)
  Tom Gorman (second round)
  Stan Smith (first round)
  Adriano Panatta (second round)
  Alex Metreveli (second round)
  Raúl Ramírez (quarterfinals)
  François Jauffret (semifinals)
  Paolo Bertolucci (first round)
  Eddie Dibbs (fourth round)
  Marty Riessen (fourth round)
  Manuel Orantes (final)
  Brian Gottfried (second round)
  Jaime Fillol Sr. (fourth round)

Qualifying

Draw

Key
 Q = Qualifier
 WC = Wild card
 LL = Lucky loser
 r = Retired

Finals

Section 1

Section 2

Section 3

Section 4

Section 5

Section 6

Section 7

Section 8

External links
 Association of Tennis Professionals (ATP) – 1974 French Open Men's Singles draw
1974 French Open – Men's draws and results at the International Tennis Federation

Men's Singles
French Open by year – Men's singles
1974 Grand Prix (tennis)